Eden Rebecca Sher (born December 26, 1991) is an American actress, best known for her roles as Sue Heck from the family sitcom series The Middle (2009–2018) and as Star Butterfly from the Disney Channel animated fantasy dramedy series Star vs. the Forces of Evil (2015–2019). She won the 2013 Critics' Choice Television Award for Best Supporting Actress in a Comedy Series for her performance in The Middle.

Early life
Sher was born in Los Angeles, California. She was raised Jewish by her single mother, a school teacher. She began her acting career at age eight by participating in school plays, local theater productions and singing in her elementary school chorus. Her interest in acting was ignited after her appearance in a Jaywalking segment on The Tonight Show with Jay Leno gained network attention.

Career
Throughout her years as an actress, she has played a number of roles in television series, but many of these were short lived, as the series were either canceled or her character was eliminated. In 2006, she played the role of Gretchen, a middle school love interest for one of the main characters, Alexander Gould, in the Showtime comedy-drama series Weeds. Later that same year, she landed the regular role as Carrie Fenton on Sons & Daughters, which was canceled 11 episodes into its first season. In 2007, Sher played a student attending Harbor High in the final season of the Fox drama series The O.C.. She also appeared in the 2001 short film Stuck and television commercials for Capital One and Fruity Pebbles.

It was not until she landed a role as Sue Heck on the ABC comedy series The Middle that she gained a starring and more permanent role. From 2009 to 2018, Sher starred in the ABC comedy series The Middle as Sue Heck, a quirky but optimistic teenager. In 2013, she won the Critics' Choice Television Award for Best Supporting Actress in a Comedy Series for her role in The Middle.

On May 30, 2018, it was reported that a spin-off focused on Eden Sher's character Sue Heck was in the works at ABC and nearing a pilot order with the goal to launch in midseason. On July 20, 2018, in an interview with TVLine's Michael Ausiello, Sher revealed that the network had ordered a pilot for the potential series, to possibly launch in early 2019. The spinoff was officially given the go ahead for a possible pilot on August 13, 2018, which could launch a series in 2019. On October 5, 2018, the potential series was given a title Sue Sue In The City, but this decision was later reversed and the series remains untitled for the time being. On November 21, 2018 however it was announced that ABC had passed on moving forward with the proposed spinoff.

Personal life
Sher announced in March 2019 that she was engaged to screenwriter Nick Cron-Devico. They married on July 12, 2020.

In 2021, Sher announced on Instagram that she and husband Nick Cron-Devico were expecting twins. They were born in late 2021.

Sher is bipolar and has publicly discussed her diagnosis, including how it impacted her pregnancy.

Filmography

Film

Television

Web

Awards and nominations

References

External links
 

Living people
21st-century American actresses
Actresses from Los Angeles
American child actresses
American film actresses
American people of Austrian-Jewish descent
American people of Russian-Jewish descent
American television actresses
American voice actresses
1991 births